A preventive war is an armed conflict "initiated in the belief that military conflict, while not imminent, is inevitable, and that to delay would involve greater risk." The party which is being attacked has a latent threat capability or it has shown that it intends to attack in the future, based on its past actions and posturing. A preventive war aims to forestall a shift in the balance of power by strategically attacking before the balance of power has had a chance to shift in the favor of the targeted party. Preventive war is distinct from preemptive strike, which is the first strike when an attack is imminent. Preventive uses of force "seek to stop another state . . . from developing a military capability before it becomes threatening or to hobble or destroy it thereafter, whereas [p]reemptive uses of force come against a backdrop of tactical intelligence or warning indicating imminent military action by an adversary."

Criticism
The majority view is that a preventive war undertaken without the approval of the United Nations is illegal under the modern framework of international law. The consensus is that preventive war "goes beyond what is acceptable in international law" and lacks legal basis. The UN High-level Panel on Threats, Challenges and Change stopped short of rejecting the concept outright but suggested that there is no right to preventive war. If there are good grounds for initiating preventive war, the matter should be put to the UN Security Council, which can authorize such action, given that one of the Council's main functions under Chapter VII of the UN Charter ("Action with Respect to Threats to the Peace, Breaches of the Peace, and Acts of Aggression") is to enforce the obligation of member states under Article 4, Paragraph 2 to "refrain in their international relations from the threat or use of force against the territorial integrity or political independence of any state . . . The Charter's drafters assumed that the Council might need to employ preventive force to forestall aggression such as initiated by Nazi Germany in the 1930s.

Examples
The Axis powers in World War II routinely invaded neutral countries on grounds of prevention and began the invasion of Poland in 1939 by claiming the Poles had attacked a border outpost first. In 1940, Germany invaded Denmark and Norway and argued that Britain might have  used them as launching points for an attack or prevented supply of strategic materials to Germany. In the summer of 1941, Germany invaded the Soviet Union, inaugurating the bloody and brutal land war by claiming that a Judeo-Bolshevik conspiracy threatened the Reich. In late 1941, the Anglo-Soviet invasion of Iran was carried out to secure a supply corridor of petrol to the Soviet Union. Iranian Shah Rezā Shāh appealed to US President Franklin Roosevelt for help but was rebuffed on the grounds that "movements of conquest by Germany will continue and will extend beyond Europe to Asia, Africa, and even to the Americas, unless they are stopped by military force."

Pearl Harbor

Perhaps the most famous example of preventive war is the attack on Pearl Harbor by the Empire of Japan on December 7, 1941. Many in the US and Japan believed war to be inevitable. Coupled to the crippling US economic embargo that was rapidly degrading the Japanese military capability, that led the Japanese leadership to believe it was better to have the war as soon as possible.

The sneak attack was partly motivated by a desire to destroy the US Pacific Fleet to allow Japan to advance with reduced opposition from the US when it secured Japanese oil supplies by fighting against the British Empire and the Dutch Empire for control over the rich East Indian (Dutch East Indies, Malay Peninsula) oil-fields. In 1940, American policies and tension toward Japanese military actions and Japanese expansionism in the Far East increased. For example, in May 1940, the base of the US Pacific Fleet that was stationed on the West Coast was forwarded to an "advanced" position at Pearl Harbor in Honolulu, Hawaii.

The move was opposed by some US Navy officials, including their commander, Admiral James Otto Richardson, who was relieved by Roosevelt. Even so, the Far East Fleet was not significantly reinforced. Another ineffective plan to reinforce the Pacific was a rather late relocation of fighter planes to bases located on the Pacific islands like Wake Island, Guam, and the Philippines. For a long time, Japanese leaders, especially leaders of the Imperial Japanese Navy, had known that the large US military strength and production capacity posed a long-term threat to Japan's imperialist desires, especially if hostilities broke out in the Pacific. War games on both sides had long reflected those expectations.

Iraq War (2003–2011)

The 2003 invasion of Iraq was framed primarily as a preemptive war by the George W. Bush administration, although President Bush also argued it was supported by Security Council Resolutions: "Under Resolutions 678 and 687--both still in effect--the United States and our allies are authorized to use force in ridding Iraq of weapons of mass destruction." At the time, the US public and its allies were led to believe that Ba'athist Iraq might have restarted its nuclear weapons program or been "cheating" on its obligations to dispose of its large stockpile of chemical weapons dating from the Iran–Iraq War. Supporters of the war have argued it to be justified, as Iraq both harbored Islamic terrorist groups sharing a common hatred of Western countries and was suspected to be developing weapons of mass destruction (WMD). Iraq's history of noncompliance of international security matters and its history of both developing and using such weapons were factors in the public perception of Iraq's having weapons of mass destruction.

In support of an attack on Iraq, US President George W. Bush stated in an address to the UN General Assembly on September 12, 2002 that the Iraqi "regime is a grave and gathering danger." However, despite extensive searches during the several years of occupation, the suspected weapons of mass destruction or weapons program infrastructure alleged by the Bush administration were not found to be functional or even known to most Iraqi leaders. Coalition forces instead found dispersed and sometimes-buried and partially dismantled stockpiles of abandoned and functionally expired chemical weapons. Some of the caches had been dangerously stored and were leaking, and many were then disposed of hastily and in secret, leading to secondary exposure from improper handling.  Allegations of mismanagement and information suppression followed.

See also
 A Clean Break: A New Strategy for Securing the Realm
 Command responsibility
 Caroline affair
 Pre-emptive nuclear strike
 Imperialism
 Jus ad bellum
 Kellogg–Briand Pact
 Legality of the Iraq War
 Military science
 UN Charter

References

External links
 The Caroline Case : Anticipatory Self-Defence in Contemporary International Law (Miskolc Journal of International Law v.1 (2004) No. 2 pp. 104-120)
 The American Strategy of Preemptive War and International Law

Counterterrorism in the United States
Aggression in international law
Law of war
Wars by type
Prevention
Warfare by type